The following were the events of gymnastics for the year 2018 throughout the world.

Acrobatic gymnastics
 February 15 – 17: FIG World Cup 2018 (AcG) #1 in  Puurs
 Pair winners:  (Robin Casse & Kilian Goffaux) (m) /  (Noémie Lammertyn & Lore Vanden Berghe) (f)
 Group winners:  (Stanislav Kukurudz, Vladyslav Kukurudz, Yurii Push, Taras Yarush) (m) /  (Daria Chebulanka, Polina Plastinina, Kseniia Zagoskina) (f)
 Mixed Pair winners:  (Victoria Aksenova & Kirill Startsev)
 March 2 – 4: FIG World Cup 2018 (AcG) #2 in  Maia
 Pair winners:  (Robin Casse & Kilian Goffaux) (m) /  (Noémie Lammertyn & Lore Vanden Berghe) (f)
 Group winners:  (Jonas Anthoon, Hannes Garre, Bram Geusens, Noam Patel) (m) /  (Daria Chebulanka, Polina Plastinina, Kseniia Zagoskina) (f)
 Mixed Pair winners:  (Victoria Aksenova & Kirill Startsev)
 April 13 – 15: 2018 Acrobatic Gymnastics World Championships in  Antwerp
 Pair winners:  (Igor Mishev & Nikolay Suprunov) (m) /  (Daria Guryeva & Daria Kalinina) (f)
 Group winners:  (Lidar Dana, Yannay Kalfa, Efi Efraim Sach, Daniel Uralevitch) (m) /  (Daria Chebulanka, Polina Plastinina, Kseniia Zagoskina) (f)
 Mixed Pair winners:  (Marina Chernova & Georgii Pataraia)
 Team winners: 
 June 29 – July 1: FIG World Cup 2018 (AcG) #3 in  Lisbon
 Event cancelled.
 November 17 & 18: FIG World Cup 2018 - AGF Trophy (AcG) #4 (final) in  Baku
 Pair winners:  (Timofei Ivanov & Maksim Karavaev) (m) /  (Iasmina Ishankulova & Diana Korotaeva)
 Group winners:  (German Kudriashov, Alexander Sorokin, Valeriy Tukhashvili, & Kirill Zadorin) (m) /  (Daria Chebulanka, Anastasiia Parshina, & Kseniia Zagoskina) (f)
 Mixed Pair winners:  (Victoria Aksenova & Kirill Startsev)

Aerobic gymnastics
 March 23 – 25: FIG World Cup 2018 #1 (AeG) in  Cantanhede
 Individual winners:  Daniel Bali (m) /  Riri Kitazume (f)
 Mixed Pair winners:  (Michela Castoldi & Davide Donati)
 Trio winners:  (Elena Ivanova, Ekaterina Pykhtova, & Anastasiia Ziubina)
 Group winners:  (Polina Amosenok, Anastasiia Gvozdetskaia, Elena Ivanova, Ekaterina Pykhtova, & Anastasiia Ziubina)
 April 21 & 22: 29th Suzuki World Cup 2018 Cat. B in  Tokyo
 Individual winners:  Mizuki Saito (m) /  Ekaterina Pykhtova (f)
 Mixed Pair winners:  (Daniel Bali & Fanni Mazacs)
 Trio winners:  (Viet Anh Nguyen, Ngoc Thuy Vi Tran & Hoai An Vuong)
 Group winners:  (Hoang Phong Le, Che Thanh Nguyen, & Viet Anh Nguyen)
 June 1 – 3: 2018 Aerobic Gymnastics World Championships in  Guimarães
  won the gold medal tally. Russia and  won 5 overall medals each.
 October 27 & 28: FIG World Cup 2018 #2 (AeG) (final) in  Plovdiv
 Individual winners:  Lucas Barbosa (m) /  Riri Kitazume (f)
 Mixed Pair winners:  (Lucas Barbosa & Tamires Silva)
 Trio winners:  (Elena Ivanova, Ekaterina Pykhtova, & Anastasiia Ziubina)
 Group winners:  (Tihomir Barotev, Ivelina Lukaki, Antonio Papazov, Darina Pashova, & Ana Maria Stoilova)

Artistic gymnastics

 February 22 – 25: FIG World Cup 2018 #1 in  Melbourne
 Floor winners:  Kazuyuki Takeda (m) /  Alexandra Eade (f)
 Women's Balance Beam winner:  CHEN Yile
 Men's Pommel Horse winner:  Nariman Kurbanov
 Men's Still Rings winner:  MA Yue
 Vault winners:  Christopher Remkes (m) /  Tjaša Kysselef (f)
 Men's Parallel Bars winner:  WU Xiaoming
 Women's Uneven Bars winner:  DU Siyu
 Men's Horizontal Bar winner:  Hidetaka Miyachi
 March 3: AT&T American Cup Individual All-Around FIG World Cup 2018 (#1) in  Chicago
 Men's All-Around winner:  Yul Moldauer
 Women's All-Around winner:  Morgan Hurd
 March 15 – 18: FIG World Cup 2018 #2 in  Baku
 Floor winners:  Kazuma Kaya (m) /  Ana Đerek (f)
 Vault winners:  Pavel Bulauski (m) /  Oksana Chusovitina (f)
 Men's horizontal bar winner:  Bart Deurloo
 Men's parallel bars winner:  Kenta Chiba
 Men's pommel horse winner:  WENG Hao
 Men's still rings winner:  Eleftherios Petrounias
 Women's balance beam winner:  Luo Huan
 Women's uneven bars winner:  LYU Jiaqi
 March 17 & 18: FIG EnBW DTB-Pokal Individual All-Around World Cup 2018 (#2) in  Stuttgart
 Men's All-Around winner:  David Belyavskiy
 Women's All-Around winner:  ZHANG Jin
 March 21 & 22: FIG Individual All-Around World Cup 2018 (#3) in  Birmingham
 Men's All-Around winner:  Shogo Nonomura
 Women's All-Around winner:  Angelina Melnikova
 March 21 – 24: FIG World Cup 2018 #3 in  Doha
 Floor winners:  Dmitriy Lankin (m) /  Elisa Meneghini (f)
 Vault winners:  Ihor Radivilov (m) /  Oksana Chusovitina (f)
 Men's horizontal bar winner:  Tin Srbic
 Men's parallel bars winner:  Zou Jingyuan
 Men's pommel horse winner:  Zou Jingyuan
 Men's still rings winner:  Ihor Radivilov
 Women's balance beam winner:  Mélanie de Jesus dos Santos
 Women's uneven bars winner:  Nina Derwael
 April 14: FIG Individual All-Around World Cup 2018 (#4) in  Tokyo
 Men's All-Around winner:  Kenzō Shirai
 Women's All-Around winner:  Mai Murakami
 May 6 – 13: 2018 African Artistic Gymnastics Championships in  Swakopmund
 Individual All-Around winners:  Omar Mohamed (m) /  Farah Hussein (f)
 Floor winners:  Omar Mohamed (m) /  Lukisha Schalk & Gabriella Murray (tie)
 Vault winners:  Mohamed Aziz Trabelsi (m) /  Nancy Taman (f)
 Men's Horizontal Bar winner:  Mohamed Reghib
 Men's Parallel Bars winner:  Hillal Metidji
 Men's Pommel Horse winner:  Mohame Aouicha
 Men's Still Rings winner:  Ali Zahran
 Women's Balance Beam winner:  Lukisha Schalk
 Women's Uneven Bars winner:  Caitlin Rooskrantz
 May 24 – 27: FIG World Challenge Cup 2018 #1 in  Osijek
 Floor winners:  Dominick Cunningham (m) /  Diana Varinska (f)
 Vault winners:  Andrey Medvedev (m) /  Oksana Chusovitina (f)
 Men's horizontal bar winner:  Tin Srbic
 Men's parallel bars winner:  Marios Georgiou
 Men's pommel horse winner:  Lee Chih-kai
 Men's still rings winner:  Denis Ablyazin
 Women's balance beam winner:  Diana Varinska
 Women's uneven bars winner:  Diana Varinska
 May 31 – June 3: FIG World Challenge Cup 2018 #2 in  Koper
 Floor winners:  Takumi Sato (m) /  Giulia Steingruber (f)
 Vault winners:  LE Thanh Tung (m) /  Giulia Steingruber (f)
 Men's horizontal bar winner:  Takaaki Sugino
 Men's parallel bars winner:  DINH Phuong Thanh
 Men's pommel horse winner:  Kohei Kameyama
 Men's still rings winner:  Kazuyuki Takeda
 Women's balance beam winner:  Céline van Gerner
 Women's uneven bars winner:  Barbora Mokosova
 June 14 – 17: FIG World Challenge Cup 2018 #3 in  Guimarães
 Floor winners:  Jorge Vega Lopez (m) /  Maisie Methuen (f)
 Vault winners:  Manrique Larduet (m) /  YEO Seo-jeong (f)
 Men's horizontal bar winner:  David Vecsernyes
 Men's parallel bars winner:  Manrique Larduet
 Men's pommel horse winner:  Thierry Pellerin
 Men's still rings winner:  Manrique Larduet
 Women's balance beam winner:  Maisie Methuen
 Women's uneven bars winner:  Ahtziri Sandoval
 July 6 – 8: FIG World Challenge Cup 2018 #4 in  Mersin
 Floor winners:  Ahmet Onder (m) /  Göksu Üçtaş (f)
 Vault winners:  Rene Cournoyer (m) /  Dipa Karmakar (f)
 Men's horizontal bar winner:  Umit Samiloglu
 Men's parallel bars winner:  Andrei Muntean
 Men's pommel horse winner:  Rhys McClenaghan
 Men's still rings winner:  İbrahim Çolak
 Women's balance beam winner:  Göksu Üçtaş
 Women's uneven bars winner:  Demet Mutlu
 August 2 – 5: 2018 European Women's Artistic Gymnastics Championships in  Glasgow
 Team winners:  (Lilia Akhaimova, Irina Alexeeva, Angelina Melnikova, Ulyana Perebinosova, & Angelina Simakova)
 Vault winner:  Boglárka Dévai
 Uneven bars winner:  Nina Derwael
 Balance beam winner:  Sanne Wevers
 Floor winner:  Mélanie de Jesus dos Santos
 August 9 – 12: 2018 European Men's Artistic Gymnastics Championships in  Glasgow
 Team winners:  (David Belyavskiy, Artur Dalaloyan, Nikolai Kuksenkov, Dmitriy Lankin, & Nikita Nagornyy)
 Floor winner:  Dominick Cunningham
 Vault winner:  Artur Dalaloyan
 Horizontal bar winner:  Oliver Hegi
 Parallel bars winner:  Artur Dalaloyan
 Pommel horse winner:  Rhys McClenaghan
 Still rings winner:  Eleftherios Petrounias
 September 11 – 15: 2018 Pan American Gymnastics Championships (Artistic) in  Lima
 Individual All-Around winners:  Manrique Larduet (m) /  Grace McCallum (f)
 Team All-Around winners:  (m) /  (f)
 Floor winners:  Tomás González (m) /  Jade Carey (f)
 Vault winners:  Caio Souza (m) /  Jade Carey (f)
 Men's Horizontal Bar winner:  Caio Souza
 Men's Parallel Bars winner:  Manrique Larduet
 Men's Pommel Horse winner:  Genki Suzuki
 Men's Still Rings winner:  Fabian de Luna
 Women's Balance Beam winner:  Kara Eaker
 Women's Uneven Bars winner:  Grace McCallum
 September 21 – 23: FIG World Challenge Cup 2018 #5 in  Szombathely
 Floor winners:  Artem Dolgopyat (m) /  Dorina Böczögő (f)
 Vault winners:  Keisuke Asato (m) /  Ofir Netzer (f)
 Men's Horizontal Bar winner:  Kenta Chiba
 Men's Parallel Bars winner:  Petro Pakhnyuk
 Men's Pommel Horse winner:  Oleg Vernyayev
 Men's Still Rings winner:  Shogo Nonomura
 Women's Balance Beam winner:  Zsófia Kovács
 Women's Uneven Bars winner:  Jonna Adlerteg
 September 29 & 30: FIG World Challenge Cup 2018 #6 in  Paris
 Floor winners:  Artem Dolgopyat (m) /  Mélanie de Jesus dos Santos (f)
 Vault winners:  Loris Frasca (m) /  Oksana Chusovitina (f)
 Men's Horizontal Bar winner:  Seiya Taura
 Men's Parallel Bars winner:  Seiya Taura
 Men's Pommel Horse winner:  Cyril Tommasone
 Men's Still Rings winner:  Samir Aït Saïd
 Women's Balance Beam winner:  Ellie Black
 Women's Uneven Bars winner:  Juliette Bossu
 October 25 – November 3: 2018 World Artistic Gymnastics Championships in  Doha
 All-Around winners:  Artur Dalaloyan (m) /  Simone Biles (f)
 Team All-Around winners:  (m) /  (f)
 Floor winners:  Artur Dalaloyan (m) /  Simone Biles (f)
 Vault winners:  Ri Se-gwang (m) /  Simone Biles (f)
 Men's Horizontal Bar winner:  Epke Zonderland
 Men's Parallel Bars winner:  Zou Jingyuan
 Men's Pommel Horse winner:  Xiao Ruoteng
 Men's Still Rings winner:  Eleftherios Petrounias
 Women's Balance Beam winner:  Liu Tingting
 Women's Uneven Bars winner:  Nina Derwael
 November 22 – 25: 43rd Turnier der Meister FIG Individual Apparatus World Cup 2018 in  Cottbus
 Floor winners:  Artem Dolgopyat (m) /  Flávia Saraiva (f)
 Vault winners:  Ihor Radivilov (m) /  Rebeca Andrade (f)
 Men's Horizontal Bar winner:  Epke Zonderland
 Men's Parallel Bars winner:  Oleg Vernyayev
 Men's Pommel Horse winner:  Lee Chih-kai
 Men's Still Rings winner:  Liu Yang
 Women's Balance Beam winner:  Rebeca Andrade
 Women's Uneven Bars winner:  Nina Derwael

Rhythmic gymnastics
 March 30 – April 1: FIG World Cup 2018 (RG) #1 in  Sofia
 Individual All-Around winner:  Aleksandra Soldatova
 Ball winner:  Aleksandra Soldatova
 Clubs winner:  Katrin Taseva
 Hoop winner:  Aleksandra Soldatova
 Ribbon winner:  Linoy Ashram
 Group All-Around winners: 
 Group Five Hoops winners: 
 Group Three Balls & Two Hoops winners: 
 April 13 – 15: World Cup 2018 (RG) #2 in  Pesaro
 Individual All-Around winner:  Dina Averina
 Ball winner:  Dina Averina
 Clubs winner:  Linoy Ashram
 Hoop winner:  Arina Averina
 Ribbon winner:  Dina Averina
 Group All-Around winners: 
 Group Five Hoops winners: 
 Group Three Balls & Two Hoops winners: 
 April 20 – 22: FIG World Cup 2018 (RG) #3 in  Tashkent
 Individual All-Around winner:  Aleksandra Soldatova
 Ball winner:  Aleksandra Soldatova
 Clubs winner:  Aleksandra Soldatova
 Hoop winner:  Aleksandra Soldatova
 Ribbon winner:  Aleksandra Soldatova
 Group All-Around winners: 
 Group Five Hoops winners: 
 Group Three Balls & Two Hoops winners: 
 April 26 – 28: 2018 African Rhythmic Gymnastics Championships in  Cairo
 Individual All-Around winner:  Habiba Marzouk
 Ball winner:  Mariam Selim
 Clubs winner:  Grace Legote
 Hoop winner:  Mariam Selim
 Ribbon winner:  Mariam Selim
 Team: 
 Group All-Around winners: 
 Group Five Hoops winners: 
 Group Three Balls & Two Hoops winners: 
 April 27 – 29: FIG World Cup 2018 (RG) #4 in  Baku
 Individual All-Around winner:  Mariia Sergeeva
 Ball winner:  Ekaterina Selezneva
 Clubs winner:  Vlada Nikolchenko
 Hoop winner:  Mariia Sergeeva
 Ribbon winner:  Mariia Sergeeva
 Group All-Around winners: 
 Group Five Hoops winners: 
 Group Three Balls & Two Hoops winners: 
 April 29 – May 2: 2018 Asian Rhythmic Gymnastics Championships in  Kuala Lumpur
 Individual All-Around winner:  Alina Adilkhanova
 Team All-Around winners: 
 Ball winner:  Alina Adilkhanova
 Clubs winner:  Sabina Tashkenbaeva
 Hoop winner:  Nurinisso Usmanova
 Ribbon winner:  Alina Adilkhanova
 Group All-Around winners: 
 Group Five Hoops winners: 
 Group Three Balls & Two Hoops winners: 
 May 4 – 6: FIG World Challenge Cup 2018 (RG #1) in  Guadalajara, Castilla-La Mancha
 Individual All-Around winner:  Linoy Ashram
 Ball winner:  Linoy Ashram
 Clubs winner:  Arina Averina
 Hoop winner:  Arina Averina
 Ribbon winner:  Aleksandra Soldatova
 Group All-Around winners: 
 Group Five Hoops winners: 
 Group Three Balls & Two Hoops winners: 
 May 11 – 13: FIG World Challenge Cup 2018 (RG #2) in  Portimão
 Individual All-Around winner:  Mariia Sergeeva
 Ball winner:  Nicol Zelikman
 Clubs winner:  Mariia Sergeeva
 Hoop winner:  Mariia Sergeeva
 Ribbon winner:  Mariia Sergeeva
 Group All-Around winners: 
 Group Five Hoops winners: 
 Group Three Balls & Two Hoops winners: 
 June 1 – 3: 2018 Rhythmic Gymnastics European Championships in  Guadalajara
 Senior Individual All-Around winner:  Arina Averina
 Senior Team winners: 
 Senior Ball winner:  Linoy Ashram
 Senior Clubs winner:  Dina Averina
 Senior Hoop winner:  Arina Averina
 Senior Ribbon winner:  Katsiaryna Halkina
 Senior Group All-Around winners: 
 Senior Group Five Hoops winners: 
 Senior Group Three Balls & Two Ropes winners: 
 August 17 – 19: FIG BSB Bank World Challenge Cup (RG #3) in  Minsk
 Individual All-Around winner:  Linoy Ashram
 Ball winner:  Ekaterina Selezneva
 Clubs winner:  Linoy Ashram
 Hoop winner:  Katsiaryna Halkina
 Ribbon winner:  Aleksandra Soldatova
 Group All-Around winners: 
 Group Five Hoops winners: 
 Group Three Balls & Two Hoops winners: 
 August 24 – 26: FIG World Challenge Cup 2018 (RG #4) in  Kazan
 Individual All-Around winner:  Aleksandra Soldatova
 Ball winner:  Dina Averina
 Clubs winner:  Dina Averina
 Hoop winner:  Dina Averina
 Ribbon winner:  Dina Averina
 Group All-Around winners: 
 Group Five Hoops winners: 
 Group Three Balls & Two Hoops winners: 
 September 10 – 16: 2018 Rhythmic Gymnastics World Championships in  Sofia
 Individual All-Around winner:  Dina Averina
 Team All-Around winners: 
 Ball winner:  Dina Averina
 Clubs winner:  Dina Averina
 Hoop winner:  Dina Averina
 Ribbon winner:  Aleksandra Soldatova
 Group All-Around winners: 
 Group Five Hoops winners: 
 Group Three Balls & Two Ropes winners: 
 September 26 – 30: 2018 Pan American Gymnastics Championships (Rhythmic) in  Lima
 Individual All-Around winner:  Laura Zeng
 Team All-Around winners: 
 Ball winner:  Laura Zeng
 Clubs winner:  Laura Zeng
 Hoop winner:  Laura Zeng
 Ribbon winner:  Laura Zeng
 Group All-Around winners: 
 Group Five Hoops winners: 
 Group Three Balls & Two Ropes winners:

Trampolining & Tumbling
 April 12 – 15: 2018 European Trampoline Championships in  Baku
  won both the gold and overall medal tallies.
 April 26 – 28: 2018 African Trampoline Championships in  Cairo
  won both the gold and overall medal tallies.
 April 27 & 28: FIG TRA World Cup 2018 #1 in  Brescia
 Individual winners:  Dong Dong (m) /  Irina Kundius (f)
 Synchronized winners:  (Dong Dong & Tu Xiao) (m) /  (ZHU Shouli & ZHU Xueying) (f)
 May 19 & 20: 2018 Asian Trampoline Gymnastics Championships in  Manila
 Senior individual winners:  Pirmammad Aliyev (m) /  Shivani Dound (f)
 Junior individual winners:  Takumi Fujimoto (m) /  FAN Xinyi (f)
 July 6 & 7: FIG TRA World Cup - 50th Nissen Cup (#2) in  Arosa
 Individual winners:  Uladzislau Hancharou (m) /  Susana Kochesok (f)
 Synchronized winners:  (Ruslan Aghamirov & Ilya Grishunin) (m) /  (Chisato Doihata & Reina Satake) (f)
 August 4 & 5: FIG TRA World Cup 2018 #3 in  Maebashi
 Individual winners:  Gao Lei (m) /  ZHU Xueying (f)
 Synchronized winners:  (Dong Dong & Tu Xiao) (m) /  (Valiantsina Bahamolava & Anhelina Khatsian) (f)
 September 5 – 9: 2018 Pan American Gymnastics Championships (Trampoline) in  Lima
 Individual winners:  Jeffrey Gluckstein (m) /  Sophiane Methot (f)
 Synchronized winners:  (Lucas Adorno & Federico Cury) (m) /  (Sophiane Methot & Sarah Milette) (f)
 Team winners:  (m) /  (f)
 Double Mini winners:  Callum Sundquist (m) /  Lucila Maldonado (f)
 Team Double Mini winners:  (m) /  (f)
 October 5 & 6: FIG TRA & TUM World Cup 2018 in  Loulé
 Individual winners:  Uladzislau Hancharou (m) /  ZHU Xueying (f)
 Synchronized winners:  (Daiki Kishi & Ryosuke Sakai) (m) /  (Rosie MacLennan & Sarah Milette) (f)
 Tumbling winners:  Vadim Afanasev (m) /  Marie Deloge (f)
 November 7 – 10: 2018 Trampoline Gymnastics World Championships in  Saint Petersburg
 Individual winners:  Gao Lei (m) /  Rosie MacLennan (f)
 Synchronized winners:  (Uladzislau Hancharou & Aleh Rabtsau) (m) /  (Hikaku Mori & Megu Uyama) (f)
 Double Mini winners:  Mikhail Zalomin (m) /  Lina Sjöberg (f)
 Tumbling winners:  Vadim Afanasev (m) /  JIA Fangfang (f)
 Team All-Around winners:

References

External links
 FIG - Fédération Internationale de Gymnastique (International Federation of Gymnastics)

 
Gymnastics by year
2018 sport-related lists